Jannette Veronica Roscoe (née Champion; born 10 June 1946) is a female British sprinter.

Athletics career
Roscoe competed in the women's 400 metres at the 1972 Summer Olympics.

She also represented England in the 400 metres, at the 1970 British Commonwealth Games in Edinburgh, Scotland. Four years later she won a gold medal in the women's 4 × 400 metres relay with Ruth Kennedy, Sue Pettett and Verona Bernard, at the 1974 British Commonwealth Games in Christchurch, New Zealand.

References

1946 births
Living people
Athletes (track and field) at the 1972 Summer Olympics
Athletes (track and field) at the 1970 British Commonwealth Games
Athletes (track and field) at the 1974 British Commonwealth Games
British female sprinters
Olympic athletes of Great Britain
People from Royal Tunbridge Wells
Commonwealth Games medallists in athletics
Commonwealth Games gold medallists for England
Olympic female sprinters
Universiade medalists in athletics (track and field)
Universiade bronze medalists for Great Britain
Medallists at the 1974 British Commonwealth Games